Caston is a surname. Notable people with the surname include:

Douglas Caston (1917–1996), Canadian newspaper publisher and politician
Geoffrey Caston (born 1926), Registrar of the University of Oxford
Leonard Caston (1917–1987), American blues musician
Leonard Caston Jr., rhythm and blues musician
Rodney Caston (born 1977), American systems engineer and writer
Toby Caston (1965–1994), American footballer